George Pullar (born 1995/1996) is an Australian actor from Brisbane. He is known for his roles as Larry Forbes in the fifth season of the Australian drama series A Place to Call Home and Daniel Fletcher in the Network Ten drama series Playing for Keeps. His performance as Larry garnered an AACTA award nomination and the Casting Guild of Australia named him one of Australia's "Rising Stars Award" recipients in 2018. His followed this up scoring the lead role of Tyler in Moon Rock For Monday, an AACTA Award nominated film, directed by Kurt Martin.

Early life
Pullar was born in Brisbane with a twin sister, Annie. Their mother originated from Adelaide and he has two other siblings. Pullar wanted to pursue a football career during his childhood, inspired by his uncle's background in the AFL. He played for a children's club in Coorparoo before the family moved to Indooroopilly. He then played for the Kenmore Australian Football Club where he decided that football would be unsuitable for him moving forward following a knee injury.

Pullar attended Brisbane Grammar School and in his final two years was required to choose an additional subject. His mother convinced him to study drama and he then realised he had a "natural ease" for acting. Due to his knee injury Pullar had the time to participate in a school theatrical performance. His drama teacher was impressed and encouraged Pullar to audition for a place at the Western Australian Academy of Performing Arts. He was successful and moved to Perth to begin his training, while his twin sister Annie became a Nine Network news reporter. During his time studying at WAAPA, Pullar and fellow students created a series of plays on old age. They researched them through a partnership with Catholic Homes which allowed them to visit the elderly in care homes. He also played the lead role of Vicomte de Valmont in a theatre performance of Dangerous Liaisons, which toured Hong Kong.

Career
Pullar began his professional acting career by starring in the short film Riptide. He also starred in another short film titled Two Girls, One on Each Knee as the Gentleman. In 2017, it was announced that Pullar had been cast in the fifth season of the Australian drama series A Place to Call Home, playing mechanic Larry Forbes. His performance gained him a nomination for the "Subscription Television Award for Best New Talent" at the 7th AACTA Awards.

Pullar had also secured the role of Private Jarrod Vogel in the television series Fighting Season. The drama focuses on the lives of a group of soldiers after they return from duty in Afghanistan. Pullar and his co-stars participated in an army boot camp run by current and former servicemen to prepare for filming; among the skills they practiced were "weapon familiarisation, weapon drills, approaching buildings, working as a group". The filming schedules for Fighting Season and A Place To Call Home overlapped, but was allowed to take part in both because they were both commissioned by Foxtel.

In May 2018, it was announced that he had secured the regular role of Daniel Fletcher in the Network Ten drama series Playing for Keeps. The show is about a group of AFL players and their wives' personal lives. That year the actor travelled to the US to pursue his career and signed with the Los Angeles management Silver Lining Entertainment. The Casting Guild of Australia chose Pullar as one of the ten recipients of the Rising Stars award for their 2018 ceremony. 

In 2019, Pullar secured the lead role of Tyler in his first feature film Moon Rock For Monday, directed by Kurt Martin and produced by Jim Robison, which was released in August 2020. In February 2020, it was announced that Pullar had secured his first role in the United States. He signed up to play Garrett Cox in the Paramount Network drama series Coyote. A casting director invited Pullar to audition for the role after viewing his audition tapes. He only received the role via a virtual audition broadcast from an underground hotel. He also voiced the character Bradley Burrows in the animation movie Combat Wombat, which was released in October 2020. Pullar appeared in a second season of Playing For Keeps but it was later cancelled. Pullar later revealed that he intended to leave the show if more series were planned.

In 2021, Pullar completed filming a role in the movie It Only Takes a Night, alongside Eliza Taylor. In 2022, Pullar released a short film titled Stonefish, which he wrote and appeared in. The film was screened as part of "Flickerfest's Best Of Australian Shorts" which toured nationally. He also appeared in the ABC drama series Barons, playing the character of Bernie Hunter Jr.

Filmography

Awards and nominations

References

External links
 

Living people
21st-century Australian male actors
Australian male television actors
Male actors from Brisbane
1990s births